Daniel Mracka (born 12 January 1984) is a Slovak former professional ice hockey player who played with HC Slovan Bratislava in the Slovak Extraliga.

References

External links

Living people
HC Slovan Bratislava players
Place of birth missing (living people)
Slovak ice hockey forwards
HC Kometa Brno players
TMH Polonia Bytom players
Újpesti TE (ice hockey) players
HK Levice players
Slovak expatriate ice hockey players in the Czech Republic
Slovak expatriate sportspeople in Poland
Slovak expatriate sportspeople in Hungary
Expatriate ice hockey players in Hungary
Expatriate ice hockey players in Poland
1984 births